Challow may refer to:

 West Challow, Oxfordshire, England
 East Challow, Oxfordshire, England
 Challow railway station, former railway station

See also
 Challow Novices' Hurdle, British horse race